David Niven (born James David Graham Niven, 1 March 1910 – 29 July 1983) was a British actor, soldier, memoirist, and novelist. He won the Academy Award for Best Actor for his performance as Major Pollock in Separate Tables (1958). Niven's other roles included Squadron Leader Peter Carter in A Matter of Life and Death (1946), Phileas Fogg in Around the World in 80 Days (1956), Sir Charles Lytton ("the Phantom") in The Pink Panther (1963), James Bond in Casino Royale (1967), and Colonel Race in Death on the Nile (1978).

Born in London, Niven attended Heatherdown Preparatory School and Stowe School before gaining a place at the Royal Military College, Sandhurst. After Sandhurst, he joined the British Army and was commissioned as a second lieutenant in the Highland Light Infantry. Upon developing an interest in acting, he found a role as an extra in the British film There Goes the Bride (1932). 

Bored with the peacetime army, he resigned his commission in 1933, relocated to New York, then travelled to Hollywood. There, he hired an agent and had several small parts in films through 1935, including a non-speaking role in Metro-Goldwyn-Mayer's Mutiny on the Bounty (1935). This helped him gain a contract with Samuel Goldwyn.

Parts, initially small, in major motion pictures followed, including Dodsworth (1936), The Charge of the Light Brigade (1936), and The Prisoner of Zenda (1937). By 1938, he was starring as the leading man in other 'A' films, including Wuthering Heights (1939). Upon the outbreak of the Second World War, Niven returned to Britain and rejoined the army, being recommissioned as a lieutenant. In 1942, he co-starred in the morale-building film about the development of the Supermarine Spitfire fighter, The First of the Few (American title Spitfire), which was enthusiastically endorsed by Winston Churchill.

Niven resumed his acting career after his demobilisation, and was voted the second-most popular British actor in the 1945 Popularity Poll of British film stars. He appeared in A Matter of Life and Death (1946), The Bishop's Wife (1947, with Cary Grant and Loretta Young), and Enchantment (1948, with Teresa Wright), all of which received critical acclaim. Niven later appeared in The Elusive Pimpernel (1950), The Toast of New Orleans (1950), Happy Go Lovely (1951), Happy Ever After (1954), and Carrington V.C. (1955) before scoring a big success as Phileas Fogg in Michael Todd's production of Around the World in 80 Days (1956). 

Niven appeared in many shows for television and nearly 100 films. He also began writing books, with considerable commercial success. In 1982, he appeared in Blake Edwards' final Pink Panther films Trail of the Pink Panther and Curse of the Pink Panther, reprising his role as Sir Charles Lytton.

Early life and family
James David Graham Niven was born on 1 March 1910 at Belgrave Mansions, Grosvenor Gardens, London, to William Edward Graham Niven (1878–1915) and his wife, Henrietta Julia (née Degacher) Niven (1878–1932). He was named David after his birth on St David's Day. Niven later claimed he was born in Kirriemuir, in the Scottish county of Angus in 1909, but his birth certificate disproves this. He had two older sisters and a brother: Margaret Joyce Niven (19001981), Henry Degacher Niven (19021953), and the sculptor Grizel Rosemary Graham (1906–2007), who created the bronze sculpture Bessie that is presented to the annual winners of the Women's Prize for Fiction.

Niven's father, William Niven, was of Scottish descent; he was killed in the First World War serving with the Berkshire Yeomanry during the Gallipoli campaign on 21 August 1915.  He is buried in Green Hill Cemetery, Turkey, in the Special Memorial Section in Plot F. 10.  Niven's paternal great grandfather and namesake, David Graham Niven, (1811–1884) was from St Martin's, a village in Perthshire. A doctor, he married in Worcestershire, and lived in Pershore.

Niven's mother, Henriette, was born in Brecon, Breconshire, Wales. Her father was Captain (brevet Major) William Degacher (1841–1879) of the 1st Battalion, 24th Regiment of Foot, who was killed at the Battle of Isandlwana during the Anglo-Zulu War in 1879. Although born William Hitchcock, in 1874, he and his older brother Lieutenant Colonel Henry Degacher (1835-1902), both followed their father, Walter Henry Hitchcock, in taking their mother's maiden name of Degacher. Henriette's mother was Julia Caroline Smith, the daughter of Lieutenant General James Webber Smith CB.

After her husband's death in Turkey in 1915, Henrietta Niven remarried in London in 1917 to Conservative politician Sir Thomas Comyn-Platt (1869 - 1961). The family moved to Rose Cottage in Bembridge on the Isle of Wight after selling their London home. In his 1971 biography, The Moon's a Balloon, Niven wrote fondly of his childhood home:
It became necessary for the house in London to be sold and our permanent address was now as advertised — a cottage which had a reputation for unreliability. When the East wind blew, the front door got stuck and when the West wind blew, the back door could not be opened – only the combined weight of the family seemed to keep it anchored to the ground. I adored it and was happier there than I had ever been, especially because, with a rare flash of genius, my mother decided that during the holidays she would be alone with her children. Uncle Tommy was barred – I don’t know where he went – to the Carlton Club I suppose.
Literary editor and biographer, Graham Lord, wrote in Niv: The Authorised Biography of David Niven, that Comyn-Platt and Niven's mother may have been in an affair well before her husband's death in 1915 and that Comyn-Platt was actually Niven's biological father, a supposition that had some support among Niven's siblings. In a review of Lord's book, Hugh Massingberd from The Spectator stated photographic evidence did show a strong physical resemblance between Niven and Comyn-Platt that "would appear to confirm these theories, though photographs can often be misleading." Niven is said to have revealed that he knew Comyn-Platt was his real father a year before his own death in 1983.

After his mother remarried, Niven's stepfather had him sent away to boarding school. In The Moon's a Balloon, Niven described the bullying, isolation, and abuse he endured as a six-year-old. He said that older pupils would regularly assault younger boys, while the schoolmasters were not much better. Niven wrote of one sadistic teacher:

Mr Croome, when he tired of pulling ears halfway out of our heads (I still have one that sticks out almost at right-angles thanks to this son of a bitch) and delivering, for the smallest mistake in Latin declension, backhanded slaps that knocked one off one’s bench, delighted in saying, ‘Show me the hand that wrote this’ — then bringing down the sharp edge of a heavy ruler across the offending wrist.

Years later, after joining the British Army, a vengeful Niven decided to return to the boarding school to pay a call on Mr Croome but he found the place abandoned and empty.
 
While attending schoolas was customary for the timeNiven received many instances of corporal punishment owing to his inclination for pranks. It was this behaviour that finally led to his expulsion from his next school, Heatherdown Preparatory School, at the age of 10½. This ended his chances for Eton College, a significant blow to his family. After failing to pass the naval entrance exam because of his difficulty with maths, Niven attended Stowe School, a newly created public school led by headmaster J. F. Roxburgh, who was unlike any of Niven's previous headmasters. Thoughtful and kind, he addressed the boys by their first names, allowed them bicycles, and encouraged and nurtured their personal interests. Niven later wrote, "How he did this, I shall never know, but he made every single boy at that school feel that what he said and what he did were of real importance to the headmaster."

In 1928, an 18-year-old Niven had sex with 15-year-old Margaret Whigham (the future socialite and Duchess of Argyll) while she was on holiday in Bembridge. To the fury of her father, Niven got Whigham pregnant. She was rushed into a London nursing home for a secret termination. "All hell broke loose," remembered  Elizabeth Duckworth, the family cook. Whigham adored Niven until the day he died. She was among the VIP guests at his London memorial service.

Military service
In 1928, Niven attended the Royal Military College, Sandhurst. He graduated in 1930 with a commission as a second lieutenant in the British Army.

He did well at Sandhurst, which gave him the "officer and gentleman" bearing that was his trademark. He requested assignment to the Argyll and Sutherland Highlanders or the Black Watch (Royal Highland Regiment), then jokingly wrote on the form, as his third choice, "anything but the Highland Light Infantry" (because that regiment wore tartan trews rather than the kilt). He was assigned to the HLI, with which he served for two years in Malta and then for a few months in Dover. In Malta, he became friends with the maverick Mike Trubshawe, and served under Roy Urquhart, future commander of the British 1st Airborne Division. On 21 October 1956, in an episode of the game show What's My Line?, Niven, as a member of the celebrity panel, was reacquainted with one of his former enlisted men. Alexander McGeachin was a guest and when his turn in the questioning came up, Niven asked, "Were you in a famous British regiment on Malta?" After McGeachin affirmed that he was, Niven quipped, "Did you have the misfortune to have me as your officer?". At that point, Niven had a brief but pleasant reunion.

Niven grew tired of the peacetime army. Though promoted to lieutenant on 1 January 1933, he saw no opportunity for further advancement. His ultimate decision to resign came after a lengthy lecture on machine guns, which was interfering with his plans for dinner with a particularly attractive young lady. At the end of the lecture, the speaker (a major general) asked if there were any questions. Showing the typical rebelliousness of his early years, Niven asked, "Could you tell me the time, sir? I have to catch a train."

After being placed under close-arrest for this act of insubordination, Niven finished a bottle of whisky with the officer who was guarding him: Rhoddy Rose (later Colonel R.L.C. Rose, DSO, MC). With Rose's assistance, Niven was allowed to escape from a first-floor window. He then headed for America. While crossing the Atlantic, Niven resigned his commission by telegram on 6 September 1933. In New York City, Niven began a brief and unsuccessful career in whisky sales, followed by a stint in horse rodeo promotion in Atlantic City, New Jersey. After detours to Bermuda and Cuba, he arrived in Hollywood in 1934.

Early film career

As an extra
When Niven presented himself at Central Casting, he learned that he needed a work permit to reside and work in the United States. As this required leaving the US, he went to Mexico, where he worked as a "gun-man", cleaning and polishing the rifles of visiting American hunters. He received his resident alien visa from the American consulate when his birth certificate arrived from Britain. He returned to the US and was accepted by Central Casting as "Anglo-Saxon Type No. 2,008."

Among the initial films in which he can be seen are Barbary Coast (1935) and Mutiny on the Bounty (1935). He secured a small role in A Feather in Her Hat (1935) at Columbia before returning to Metro-Goldwyn-Mayer for a bit role, billed as David Nivens, in Rose Marie (1936).

Sam Goldwyn
Niven's role in Mutiny on the Bounty brought him to the attention of independent film producer Samuel Goldwyn, who signed him to a contract and established his career.

For Goldwyn, Niven again had a small role in Splendor (1935). He was lent to MGM for a minor part in Rose Marie (1936), then a larger one in Palm Springs (1936) at Paramount.

His first sizeable role for Goldwyn came in Dodsworth (1936), playing a man who flirts with Ruth Chatterton. In that same year he was again loaned out, to 20th Century Fox to play Bertie Wooster in Thank You, Jeeves! (1936), before finally landing a sizable role as a soldier in The Charge of the Light Brigade (1936) at Warners, an Imperial adventure film starring his housemate at the time, Errol Flynn.

Niven was fourth billed in Beloved Enemy (1936) for Goldwyn, supporting Merle Oberon with whom he became romantically involved. Universal used him in We Have Our Moments (1937) and he had another good supporting role in David O. Selznick's The Prisoner of Zenda (1937).

Fox Studios gave him the lead in a B picture, Dinner at the Ritz (1938) and he again had a supporting role in Bluebeard's Eighth Wife (1938) directed by Ernst Lubitsch at Paramount. Niven was one of the four heroes in John Ford's Four Men and a Prayer (1938), also with Fox. He remained with Fox to play the part of a fake love interest in Three Blind Mice (1938).

Niven joined what became known as the Hollywood Raj, a group of British actors in Hollywood which included Rex Harrison, Boris Karloff, Stan Laurel, Basil Rathbone, Ronald Colman, Leslie Howard, and C. Aubrey Smith. According to his autobiography, Errol Flynn and he were firm friends and rented Rosalind Russell's house at 601 North Linden Drive as a bachelor pad.

Leading man

Niven graduated to star parts in "A" films with The Dawn Patrol (1938) remake at Warners; although he was billed below Errol Flynn and Basil Rathbone, it was a leading role and the film did excellent business. Niven was reluctant to take a supporting part in Wuthering Heights (1939) for Goldwyn, but eventually relented and the film was a big success.

RKO borrowed him to play Ginger Rogers' leading man in the romantic comedy Bachelor Mother (1939), which was another big hit. Goldwyn used him to support Gary Cooper in the adventure tale The Real Glory (1939), and Walter Wanger cast him opposite Loretta Young in Eternally Yours (1939). Finally, Goldwyn granted Niven a lead part, the title role as the eponymous gentleman safe-cracker in Raffles (1939).

Second World War
The day after Britain declared war on Germany in 1939, Niven returned home and rejoined the British Army. He was alone among British stars in Hollywood in doing so; the British Embassy advised most actors to stay.

Niven was recommissioned as a lieutenant in the Rifle Brigade (Prince Consort's Own) on 25 February 1940, and was assigned to a motor training battalion. He wanted something more exciting, however, and transferred to the Commandos. He was assigned to a training base at Inverailort House in the Western Highlands. Niven later claimed credit for bringing future Major General Sir Robert E. Laycock to the Commandos. Niven commanded "A" Squadron GHQ Liaison Regiment, better known as "Phantom". He was promoted to war-substantive captain on 18 August 1941.

Film work

Niven also worked with the Army Film and Photographic Unit. His work included a small part in the deception operation that used minor actor M. E. Clifton James to impersonate General Sir Bernard Montgomery. During his work with the AFPU, Peter Ustinov, one of the script-writers, had to pose as Niven's batman. Niven explained in his autobiography that there was no military way that he, a lieutenant-colonel, and Ustinov, who was only a private, could associate, other than as an officer and his subordinate, hence their strange "act". In 1978, Niven and Ustinov would star together in a film adaption of Agatha Christie's Death on the Nile.

He acted in two wartime films not formally associated with the AFPU, but both made with a firm view to winning support for the British war effort, especially in the United States. These were The First of the Few (1942), directed by Leslie Howard, and The Way Ahead (1944), directed by Carol Reed. Peter Ustinov also played a large supporting role as a Frenchman in The Way Ahead.

Niven was also given a significant if largely unheralded role in the creation of SHAEF's military radio efforts conceived to provide entertainment to American, British and Canadian forces in England and Europe. In 1944 he worked extensively with the BBC and SHAEF to expand these broadcast efforts. He also worked extensively with Major Glenn Miller, whose Army Air Force big band, formed in the US, was performing and broadcasting for troops in England. Niven played a role in the operation to move the Miller band to France prior to Miller's December 1944 disappearance while flying over the English Channel.

Europe
On 14 March 1944, Niven was promoted war-substantive major (temporary lieutenant-colonel). He took part in the Allied invasion of Normandy in June 1944, although he was sent to France several days after D-Day. He served in "Phantom", a secret reconnaissance and signals unit which located and reported enemy positions, and kept rear commanders informed on changing battle lines. Niven was posted at one time to Chilham in Kent. He spoke little about his experience in the war, despite public interest in celebrities in combat and a reputation for storytelling. He once said:

Niven had particular scorn for those newspaper columnists covering the war who typed out self-glorifying and excessively florid prose about their meagre wartime experiences. Niven stated, "Anyone who says a bullet sings past, hums past, flies, pings, or whines past, has never heard onethey go crack!" He gave a few details of his war experience in his autobiography, The Moon's a Balloon: his private conversations with Winston Churchill, the bombing of London, and what it was like entering Germany with the occupation forces. Niven first met Churchill at a dinner party in February 1940. Churchill singled him out from the crowd and stated, "Young man, you did a fine thing to give up your film career to fight for your country. Mark you, had you not done soit would have been despicable."

A few stories have surfaced. About to lead his men into action, Niven eased their nervousness by telling them, "Look, you chaps only have to do this once. But I'll have to do it all over again in Hollywood with Errol Flynn!" Asked by suspicious American sentries during the Battle of the Bulge who had won the World Series in 1943, he answered, "Haven't the foggiest idea, but I did co-star with Ginger Rogers in Bachelor Mother!"

Niven ended the war as a lieutenant-colonel. On his return to Hollywood after the war, he received the Legion of Merit, an American military decoration. It honoured Niven's work in setting up the BBC Allied Expeditionary Forces Programme, a radio news and entertainment station for the Allied forces.

Postwar career

Niven resumed his career while still in England, playing the lead in A Matter of Life and Death (1946), from the team of Powell and Pressburger. The movie was critically acclaimed, popular in England and was selected as the first Royal Film Performance.

Return to Hollywood
Niven returned to Hollywood and encountered tragedy when his first wife died after falling down a flight of stairs at a party. Goldwyn lent him to play Aaron Burr in Magnificent Doll (1946) opposite Ginger Rogers, then to Paramount for The Perfect Marriage (1947) with Loretta Young and Enterprise Productions for The Other Love (1947).

For Goldwyn he supported Cary Grant and Young in The Bishop's Wife (1947). He returned to England when Goldwyn lent him to Alexander Korda to play the title role in Bonnie Prince Charlie (1948), a notorious box office flop.

Back in Hollywood Niven was in Goldwyn's Enchantment (1948) with Teresa Wright. At Warner Bros he was in a comedy A Kiss in the Dark (1948) with Jane Wyman, then he appeared opposite Shirley Temple in the comedy A Kiss for Corliss (1949). None of these films was successful at the box office and Niven's career was struggling.

He returned to Britain to play the title role in The Elusive Pimpernel (1950) from Powell and Pressberger, which was to have been financed by Korda and Goldwyn. Goldwyn pulled out and the film did not appear in the US for three years. Niven had a long, complex relationship with Goldwyn, who gave him his first start, but the dispute over The Elusive Pimpernel and Niven's demands for more money led to a long estrangement between the two in the 1950s.

Career decline

Niven struggled for a while to recapture his former position. He supported Mario Lanza in a musical at MGM, The Toast of New Orleans (1950). He then went to England and appeared in a musical with Vera-Ellen, Happy Go Lovely (1951); it was little seen in the US but was a big hit in Britain. He had a support role in MGM's Soldiers Three (1951) similar to those early in his career. Niven had a far better part in the British war film Appointment with Venus (1952), which was popular in England. The Lady Says No (1952) was a poorly received American comedy at the time.

Comeback
Niven decided to try Broadway, appearing opposite Gloria Swanson in Nina (1951–52). The play ran for only 45 performances but it was seen by Otto Preminger, who decided to cast Niven in the film version of the play The Moon Is Blue (1953). As preparation Preminger, who had directed the play in New York, insisted that Niven appear on stage in the West Coast run. The Moon Is Blue, a sex comedy, became notorious when it was released without a Production Code Seal of Approval; it was a big hit and Niven won a Golden Globe Award for his role.

Niven's next few films were made in England: The Love Lottery (1954), a comedy; Carrington V.C. (1954), a drama that earned Niven a BAFTA nomination for Best Actor; Happy Ever After (1954), a comedy with Yvonne de Carlo, which was hugely popular in Britain.

In Hollywood, he had a thankless role as the villain in an MGM swashbuckler The King's Thief (1955). He had a better part in The Birds and the Bees (1956), portraying a conman in a remake of The Lady Eve (1941), in which Niven played a third-billed supporting role under American television comedian George Gobel and leading lady Mitzi Gaynor. Niven also appeared in the British romantic comedy The Silken Affair (1956) with Geneviève Page the same year.

Around the World in 80 Days
Niven's professional fortunes were completely restored when cast as Phileas Fogg in Around the World in 80 Days (1956), a huge hit at the box office. It also won the Academy Award for Best Picture. He followed it with Oh, Men! Oh, Women! (1957); The Little Hut (1957), from the writer of The Moon is Blue and a success at the box office; My Man Godfrey (1957), a screwball comedy; and Bonjour Tristesse (1958), for Preminger. Niven worked in television. He appeared several times on various short-drama shows and was one of the "four stars" of the dramatic anthology series Four Star Playhouse, appearing in 33 episodes. The show was produced by Four Star Television, which was co-owned and founded by Niven, Ida Lupino, Dick Powell and Charles Boyer. The show ended in 1955, but Four Star TV became a highly successful TV production company.

Separate Tables

Niven is the only person to win an Academy Award at the ceremony he was hosting. He won the 1958 Academy Award for Best Actor for his role as Major Pollock in Separate Tables, his only nomination for an Oscar. Appearing on-screen for only 23 minutes in the film, this is the briefest performance ever to win a Best Actor Oscar. He was also a co-host of the 30th, 31st, and 46th Academy Awards ceremonies. After Niven had won the Academy Award, Goldwyn called with an invitation to his home. In Goldwyn's drawing-room, Niven noticed a picture of himself in uniform which he had sent to Goldwyn from Britain during the Second World War. In happier times with Goldwyn, he had observed this same picture sitting on Goldwyn's piano. Now years later, the picture was still in exactly the same spot. As he was looking at the picture, Goldwyn's wife Frances said, "Sam never took it down."

With an Academy Award to his credit, Niven's career continued to thrive. In 1959, he became the host of his own TV drama series, The David Niven Show, which ran for 13 episodes that summer.

He played the lead in some comedies: Ask Any Girl (1959), with Shirley MacLaine; Happy Anniversary (1959) with Mitzi Gaynor; and Please Don't Eat the Daisies (1960) with Doris Day, a big hit.

International star

Even more popular was the action film The Guns of Navarone (1961) with Gregory Peck and Anthony Quinn. This role led to him being cast in further war and/or action movies: The Captive City (1962); The Best of Enemies (1962); Guns of Darkness (1962); 55 Days at Peking (1963) with Charlton Heston and Ava Gardner.

Niven returned to comedy with The Pink Panther (1963) also starring Peter Sellers, another huge success at the box office. Less so was the comedy Bedtime Story (1964) with Marlon Brando.

In 1964, Charles Boyer, Gig Young and top-billed Niven appeared in the Four Star series The Rogues. Niven played Alexander 'Alec' Fleming, one of a family of retired con-artists who now fleece villains in the interests of justice. This was his only recurring role on television, and the series was originally set up to more or less revolve between the three leads in various combinations (one-lead, two-lead and three-lead episodes), although the least otherwise busy Gig Young wound up carrying most of the series. The Rogues ran for only one season, but won a Golden Globe award and currently remains a cult favourite.

In 1965, he made two films for MGM: the Peter Ustinov-directed Lady L, supporting Paul Newman and Sophia Loren, and Where the Spies Are, as a doctor-turned-secret agentMGM hoped it would lead to a series, but this did not happen. After the horror film Eye of the Devil (1966), Niven appeared as James Bond in Casino Royale (1967), the only man to only ever portray Bond in a non-Eon Productions film. Niven had been Bond creator Ian Fleming's first choice to play Bond in Dr. No. Casino Royale co-producer Charles K. Feldman said later that Fleming had written the book with Niven in mind, and therefore had sent a copy to Niven. Niven was the only actor who played James Bond mentioned by name in the text of a Fleming novel. In chapter 14 of You Only Live Twice, the pearl diver Kissy Suzuki refers to Niven as "the only man she liked in Hollywood", and the only person who "treated her honourably" there.

Niven made some popular comedies, Prudence and the Pill (1968) and The Impossible Years (1968). Less widely seen was The Extraordinary Seaman (1969). The Brain (1969), a French comedy with Bourvil and Jean-Paul Belmondo, was the most popular film at the French box office in 1969 but was not widely seen in English-speaking countries.

He did a war drama Before Winter Comes (1969) then returned to comedy in The Statue (1971).

Later career
Niven was in demand throughout the last decade of his life: King, Queen, Knave (1972); Vampira (1974); Paper Tiger (1975); No Deposit, No Return (1976), a Disney comedy; Candleshoe (1977), one of several stars in a popular comedy; Murder By Death (1976), Death on the Nile (1978), one of many stars and another hit; A Nightingale Sang in Berkeley Square (1979); Escape to Athena (1979), produced by his son; Rough Cut (1980), supporting Burt Reynolds; and The Sea Wolves (1980), a wartime adventure movie.

In 1974, while Niven was co-hosting the 46th Annual Oscars ceremony, a naked man (Robert Opel) appeared behind him, "streaking" across the stage. In what instantly became a live-TV classic moment, Niven responded "Isn't it fascinating to think that probably the only laugh that man will ever get in his life is by stripping off and showing his shortcomings?".

That same year, he hosted David Niven's World for London Weekend Television, which profiled contemporary adventurers such as hang gliders, motorcyclists, and mountain climbers: it ran for 21 episodes. In 1975, he narrated The Remarkable Rocket, a short animation based on a story by Oscar Wilde.

Last films
Niven's last sizeable film part was in Better Late Than Never (1983). In July 1982, Blake Edwards brought Niven back for cameo appearances in two final "Pink Panther" films (Trail of the Pink Panther and Curse of the Pink Panther), reprising his role as Sir Charles Lytton. By this time, Niven was having serious health problems. When the raw footage was reviewed, his voice was inaudible, and his lines had to be dubbed by Rich Little. Niven only learned of it from a newspaper report. This was his last film appearance.

Writing

Niven wrote four books. The first, Round the Rugged Rocks (published simultaneously in the US under the title Once Over Lightly), was a novel that appeared in 1951 and was forgotten almost at once. The plot was plainly autobiographical (although not recognised as such at the time of publication), involving a young soldier, John Hamilton, who leaves the British army, becomes a liquor salesman in New York, is involved in indoor horse racing, goes to Hollywood, becomes a deckhand on a fishing boat, and finally ends up as a highly successful film star.

In 1971, he published his autobiography, The Moon's a Balloon, which was well received, selling over five million copies. He followed this with Bring On the Empty Horses in 1975, a collection of entertaining reminiscences from Hollywood's "Golden Age" in the 1930s and 1940s. As more of a raconteur rather than an accurate memoirist, it seems that Niven recounted many incidents from a first-person perspective that actually happened to other people, among them Cary Grant. This liberal borrowing and embroidering of his personal history was also said to be the reason why he persistently refused to appear on This Is Your Life. Niven's penchant for exaggeration and embroidery is particularly apparent when comparing his written descriptions of his early film appearances (especially Barbary Coast and A Feather in her Hat), and his Oscar acceptance speech, with the actual filmed evidence. In all three examples, the reality is significantly different from Niven's heavily fictionalised accounts as presented in The Moon's a Balloon and related in various chat show appearances.

In 1981 Niven published a second and much more successful novel, Go Slowly, Come Back Quickly, which was set during and after the Second World War, and which drew on his experiences during the war and in Hollywood. He was working on a third novel at the time of his death.

Personal life

While on leave in 1940, Niven met Primula "Primmie" Susan Rollo (18 February 1918 – 21 May 1946), the daughter of London lawyer William H.C. Rollo. After a whirlwind romance, they married on 16 September 1940. A son, David, Jr., was born in December 1942 and a second son, James Graham Niven, on 6 November 1945. Primmie died at the age of 28, only six weeks after the family moved to the US. She fractured her skull in a fall in the Beverly Hills, California home of Tyrone Power, while playing a game of sardines. She had walked through a door believing it to be a closet, but instead, it led to a stone staircase to the basement.

In 1948, Niven met and married Hjördis Paulina Tersmeden (née Genberg, 1919–1997), a divorced Swedish fashion model. He recounted their meeting:

In 1960, Niven bought a chalet in Château-d'Œx near Gstaad in Switzerland for financial reasons, living near expatriate friends that included Deborah Kerr, Peter Ustinov, and Noël Coward. It is believed by some that Niven's choice to become a tax exile may have been one reason why he never received a British honour. However, Kerr, Ustinov, and Coward were all honoured. A 2009 biography of Niven contained assertions that he had an affair with Princess Margaret, who was 20 years his junior. He also became close friends with William F. Buckley and his wife Pat; Buckley wrote a memorial tribute to him in Miles Gone By (2004).

Niven divided his time in the 1960s and 1970s between his chalet in Château-d'Œx and Cap Ferrat on the Côte d'Azur in the south of France.

Death
In 1980 Niven began experiencing fatigue, muscle weakness and a warble in his voice. His 1981 interviews on the talk shows of Michael Parkinson and Merv Griffin alarmed family and friends; viewers wondered if Niven had either been drinking or suffered a stroke. He blamed his slightly slurred voice on the shooting schedule of the film he had been making, Better Late Than Never. He was diagnosed with amyotrophic lateral sclerosis (ALS, also known in the USA as "Lou Gehrig's disease") later that year. His final appearance in Hollywood was hosting the 1981 American Film Institute tribute to Fred Astaire.

In February 1983, using a false name to avoid publicity, Niven was hospitalised for 10 days, ostensibly for a digestive problem; afterwards he returned to his chalet at Château-d'Œx. Though his condition continued to worsen he refused to return to the hospital, a decision supported by his family. He died at his chalet from ALS on 29 July, aged 73. David Niven was buried on 2 August 1983 in the local cemetery of Château-d'Œx.

Legacy
A Thanksgiving service for Niven was held at St Martin-in-the-Fields, London, on 27 October 1983. The congregation of 1,200 included Prince Michael of Kent, Margaret, Duchess of Argyll, Sir John Mills, Sir Richard Attenborough, Trevor Howard, David Frost, Joanna Lumley, Douglas Fairbanks, Jr. and Lord Olivier.

Biographer Graham Lord wrote, "the biggest wreath, worthy of a Mafia Godfather's funeral, was delivered from the porters at London's Heathrow Airport, along with a card that read: 'To the finest gentleman who ever walked through these halls. He made a porter feel like a king.

In 1985, Niven was included in a series of British postage stamps, along with Sir Alfred Hitchcock, Sir Charles Chaplin, Peter Sellers and Vivien Leigh, to commemorate "British Film Year".

Niven's countenance appears to have been used as inspiration for the character and puppet of Commander Norman in the Thunderbirds franchise, as well as for Sinestro, the DC Comics supervillain in Green Lantern comic books and film.

Niven's Bonjour Tristesse co-star, Mylène Demongeot, declared about him, in a 2015 filmed interview:"He was like a Lord, he was part of those great actors who were extraordinary like Dirk Bogarde, individuals with lots of class, elegance and humour. I only saw David get angry once. Preminger had discharged him for the day but eventually asked to get him. I said, sir, you had discharged him, he left for Deauville to gamble at the casino. So we rented a helicopter so they immediately went and grabbed him. Two hours later, he was back, full of rage. There I saw David lose his British phlegm, his politeness and class. It was royal. [Laughs]."

Acting credits

Works 
 Niven, David (1951). Round the Rugged Rocks. London: The Cresset Press.

Further reading

See also

References

External links

 
 
 
 
 
 
 

1910 births
1983 deaths
20th-century English male actors
Best Actor Academy Award winners
Best Drama Actor Golden Globe (film) winners
Best Musical or Comedy Actor Golden Globe (film) winners
British Army Commandos officers
British Army personnel of World War II
British expatriates in Switzerland
British expatriates in the United States
Burials in Switzerland
Deaths from motor neuron disease
English male film actors
English male stage actors
English male television actors
English memoirists
English people of French descent
English people of Scottish descent
English people of Welsh descent
Foreign recipients of the Legion of Merit
Graduates of the Royal Military College, Sandhurst
Highland Light Infantry officers
Male actors from London
Neurological disease deaths in Switzerland
People educated at Heatherdown School
People educated at Stowe School
People from Buckland, Oxfordshire
People from Château-d'Œx
Military personnel from London
Rifle Brigade officers
English autobiographers